Jean de Maillard (born 15 August 1951 in Saint-Germain-en-Laye, Yvelines) is a French magistrate in Blois.

He wrote several books concerning financial crime. He also co-signed a 9 May 2001 op-ed in Le Monde with Bernard Bertossa, attorney general in Geneva, Benoît Dejemeppe, king's attorney in Bruxelles (procureur du roi), Eva Joly, investigative magistrate in Paris, and Renaud van Ruymbeke, judge in Paris, entitled The 'black boxes' of financial globalization, that supported reporter Denis Robert in his investigations concerning the Clearstream Affair.

Books 

  Les beaux jours du crime. Vers une société criminelle ? Plon, 1992.
  Un monde sans loi. La criminalité financière en images. Editions Stock, 1999.

References

1951 births
Living people
People from Saint-Germain-en-Laye
20th-century French judges
21st-century French judges